Sir Dermod Art Pelly Murphy, CMG, OBE (10 August 1914 – 21 October 1975) was an Irish-born British colonial administrator. He was Governor of Saint Helena from 1968 to 1971.

British colonial governors and administrators in Africa
Governors of Saint Helena
Knights Bachelor
1914 births
1975 deaths

References